Venus Disrobing for the Bath is an oil painting by Frederic Leighton, first exhibited in 1867.

History 
Leighton's five contributions to the Royal Academy of 1867 were marked by an increasing devotion to Greek ideals, and by a refinement of finish. Among the pictures exhibited was Venus Disrobing for the Bath, one of the most debated of all the artist's paintings of the nude.

Analysis 
The paleness of the flesh-tint of this Venus aroused a criticism which has often been urged against his pictures that such a hue was not in nature. In imparting an ideal effect to an ideal subject, Leighton always, however, followed his own conviction that art has a law of its own, and a harmony of colour and form, derived and selected no doubt from natural loveliness, but not to be referred too closely to the natural, or to the average, in these things.

The art critic J. B. Atkinson praised the work, declaring that "Mr Leighton, instead of adopting corrupt Roman notions regarding Venus such as Rubens embodied, has wisely reverted to the Greek idea of Aphrodite, a goddess worshipped, and by artists painted, as the perfection of female grace and beauty." According to Edgcumbe Staley:

See also 

 Aphrodite Urania
 Venus Anadyomene

References

Sources 

 Ash, Russell (1995). Lord Leighton. London: Pavilion Books Limited. p. 13.
 Gaunt, William (1975). Victorian Olympus. London: Sphere Books Ltd. pp. 78, 79, 175.
 Jones, Stephen, et al. (1996). Frederic Leighton, 1830–1896. Royal Academy of Arts, London: Harry N. Abrams, Inc. pp. 27–28, 39, 109, 119, 145, 170, 214.
 Rhys, Ernest (1900). Frederic Lord Leighton: An Illustrated Record of his Life and Work. London: George Bell & Sons. pp. 24–25, 110, 124, 143.
 Smith, Alison (1996). The Victorian Nude: Sexuality, Morality, and Art. Manchester: Manchester University Press. p. 145–46.
 Staley, Edgcumbe (1906). Lord Leighton of Stretton. London: The Walter Scott Publishing Co., Ltd.; New York: Charles Scribner's Sons. p. 73.
 "A Pastoral by Frederic Lord Leighton". The Victorian Web. 2 December 2004. Accessed 2 July 2022.

1867 paintings
Mythological paintings by Frederic Leighton
Nude art
Women in art
Bathing in art
Paintings of Venus